Kirov class may refer to:

 , Project 1144 Orlan missile-armed cruisers built for the Soviet Navy in 1980 and serving now in the Russian Navy;
 , Project 26 cruisers that were built for the Soviet Navy in 1939–1944, served in World War II and were decommissioned by 1974.

See also
Kirov (disambiguation)